Abdrakhmanovo (Abdraxman) is a rural locality (a village) in Tatlybayevsky Selsoviet of Baymaksky District, Bashkortostan, Russia. The population was 239 as of 2010. There are 4 streets.

Geography 
Abdrakhmanovo is located 38 km east of Baymak (the district's administrative centre) by road. Karyshkino is the nearest rural locality.

Ethnicity 
The village is inhabited by Bashkirs and others.

References 

Rural localities in Baymaksky District